Stephanie Joffroy (born 12 September 1991 in Santiago, Chile) is a competitor for Chile at the 2014 Winter Olympics and 2018 Winter Olympics in the Women's ski cross.

References 

1991 births
Living people
Freestyle skiers at the 2014 Winter Olympics
Freestyle skiers at the 2018 Winter Olympics
Chilean female freestyle skiers
Olympic freestyle skiers of Chile
21st-century Chilean women